The Chitra River is located in southwestern Bangladesh. It is one of the large coastal rivers of the Ganges-Padma system. It joins with the Nabaganga, and then flows into the Bhairab River.

References

Rivers of Bangladesh
Rivers of Khulna Division